David Porter (1849 - August 7, 1893) was an Ontario businessman and political figure. He represented Bruce North in the Legislative Assembly of Ontario from 1891 to 1893 as a Liberal member.

Porter was born in Halton County in 1847, the son of Irish immigrants. He built and operated a sawmill in Amabel Township. In 1884, he married Eliza Chambers. Porter served as reeve for Amabel from 1880 to 1883 and in 1885. He was defeated in the general election held in 1890 but elected in an 1891 by-election held after the election of John George was overturned on appeal. He died in office in 1893.

References

External links 

The Canadian parliamentary companion, 1891 JA Gemmill
The History of the County of Bruce  ..., N Robertson

1849 births
1893 deaths
Ontario Liberal Party MPPs